Barry Olivier (November 2, 1935 in San Francisco, California) is a retired professional guitar teacher, and creator/producer of the Berkeley Folk Music Festivals from 1958 to 1970.

https://sites.northwestern.edu/bfmf/barry-olivier-festival-director/

Early life 

Olivier grew up living in the San Francisco Bay Area cities of Belvedere, Brentwood and Berkeley, moving several times as his father was a school principal. He moved to Berkeley in 1947 as a teenager. Olivier lived in Berkeley until the early 1980s, and since then has lived in Oakland, California.

Career 

Olivier has been part of the Berkeley folk music scene since the 1950s. He was influenced by folk revivalists such as Burl Ives, Carl Sandburg, and John Jacob Niles, who he saw perform on campus at Cal. Beginning in 1956 he hosted “The Midnight Special” on KPFA radio. He started a music instrument shop in Berkeley, The Barrel Folk Music Center, to serve the growing folk music community during the mid-1950s.

In 1958, Olivier, as a former student of UC Berkeley envisioned and created The Berkeley Folk Festival which became an annual event, directed and produced by Olivier, until 1970. Performers and workshop participants included Alan Lomax, Doc Watson and his son Merle, Joan Baez, Pete Seeger, Mississippi John Hurt, Almeda Riddle, Mance Lipscomb, Alice Stuart, and folklorists Charles Seeger and Archie Green. Associate festival producer John Chambless described Olivier as having produced the festivals almost single-handedly and with "enormous good taste." He produced all of Joan Baez’s Northern California concerts from 1962 to 1973.

In 1974, Olivier's archive of folk festival materials was acquired by Northwestern University (ibid). This festival was the subject of history and American studies professor Michael J. Kramer’s research seminar “Digitizing Folk Music History: The Berkeley Folk Festival.” In May 2011, he spoke at Northwestern about his experience during the 1960s.

In 2021, Northwestern University (ibid) published its digital archive of the Berkeley Folk Music Festival. 

Olivier was a Bay Area guitar teacher. He taught a young boy from El Cerrito, California named John Fogerty his first guitar lessons, and helped Kate Wolf perfect her guitar playing technique. He is the father of five children.

He retired from teaching in 2019, after being diagnosed with dementia.

In June 2020, his students formed a Facebook group, Friends of Barry Olivier.

Media 
Joan Baez concert handbill, 16 April 1967 (Barry Olivier, Producer)

References

External links 
 Barry Olivier's website

1935 births
Guitarists from San Francisco
Living people
American male guitarists
20th-century American guitarists
20th-century American male musicians